The Penny Venetian Red was a British postage stamp equal to the value of one penny.  Issued in 1880, it was designed and surface-printed by security printing company De La Rue. It superseded the Penny Red that had been used in Great Britain  since 1841, and was the third one-penny stamp to enter regular usage in the country.

The Venetian Red was aesthetically similar to the Penny Red and Penny Black that had come before it, but was instead coloured a venetian red and had a square framing. Close to 1.5 million Venetian Reds were printed during the stamp's run; the printing plates used allowed for 240 stamps each. Like its predecessors, the Venetian Red sported individual letters in each of its corners to identify its position on the plate.

{| style="text-align:center;" class="collapsible-collapsed;"
|+ Plate configuration
|AA
|AB
|AC
|AD
|AE
|AF
|AG
|AH
|AI
|AJ
|AK
|AL
|-
|BA 
|BB 
|BC 
|BD 
|BE 
|BF 
|BG 
|BH 
|BI 
|BJ 
|BK 
|BL
|-
|• 
|• 
|• 
|•
|• 
|• 
|• 
|• 
|• 
|• 
|• 
|•
|-
|• 
|• 
|• 
|•
|• 
|• 
|• 
|• 
|• 
|• 
|• 
|•
|-
|• 
|• 
|• 
|•
|• 
|• 
|• 
|• 
|• 
|• 
|• 
|•
|-
|SA 
|SB 
|SC 
|SD 
|SE 
|SF 
|SG 
|SH 
|SI 
|SJ 
|SK 
|SL
|-
|TA 
|TB 
|TC 
|TD 
|TE 
|TF 
|TG 
|TH 
|TI 
|TJ 
|TK 
|TL
|}

The Venetian Red had a short run, and was replaced by the Penny Lilac in July 1881. Its displacement is attributed to a change in government postal policy: the Customs and Inland Revenue Act 1881 necessitated the creation of a new provision of revenue stamps. A new inscription was therefore needed, and the new Penny Lilacs featured the words "POSTAGE AND INLAND REVENUE" and "ONE PENNY", instead of "POSTAGE" and "ONE PENNY" that its predecessors bore. It was decided that a new colour would also be desirable to defend against improper re-use; a fugitive lilac ink was used that would run and spoil the stamp if one attempted to wash off the cancellation. The Lilacs broke the tradition of using corner letters and instead had either fourteen or sixteen dots in each corner.

See also 
Postage stamps and postal history of Great Britain

Notes 

Postage stamps of the United Kingdom
Cultural depictions of Queen Victoria